Truthfully Truthfully is the second album by artist Joel Plaskett under the band name Joel Plaskett Emergency and his third since splitting from Thrush Hermit.

Track listing 
All songs written by Joel Plaskett except where noted.
 "Written All Over Me" – 3:52
 "Work Out Fine" – 3:37
 "Mystery and Crime" – 3:30
 "Extraordinary" – 3:48
 "Come On Teacher" – 3:47
 "The Red Light" – 4:46
 "Radio Fly" – 3:53
 "You Came Along" – 4:40
 "Lights Down Low" – 3:46
 "The Day You Walked Away" – 3:49
 "All the Pretty Faces" – 3:25
 "Heart to Heart With Lionel" (David Marsh) – 3:09

Album credits

Personnel
Joel Plaskett - Guitar
Dave Marsh - Drums
Tim Brennan - Bass

Production
Recorded at Sonic Temple, Halifax, Nova Scotia (May 2003)
Produced by Ian McGettigan and Joel Plaskett
Engineered by Ian McGettigan and Charles Austin
Assistant Engineer - Darren Van Niekerk
Mixed at Iguauna Recording, Toronto, Ontario (June 2003)
Mixing Engineer - Alfio Annibalini
Assistant Mixing Engineer - John Nazario
Mastered by Brett Zilahi at Metalworks Studios, Toronto, ON

References

2003 albums
Joel Plaskett albums
MapleMusic Recordings albums